Pemba was the name that was given to a rare 8-year-old Asian male red panda who resided at the Turtle Back Zoo located in West Orange, New Jersey from 2007 to 2008. He was easily recognized during his stay at the zoo by all his fans due to his white face, black legs and red body.

Life at the zoo
Pemba resided in the Turtle Back Zoo during 2007.  Patrons to the zoo were able to see Pemba through his plexiglass enclosure, located in the zoo's Asian animal exhibit.

Death
Pemba's death which came approximately two weeks before Ling Ling's (Ueno Zoo's giant panda who also died in April 2008) is believed to have been caused by "diseases pandas are prone to" according to zoo director, Dr. Jeremy Goodman.

See also
 Local names of the red panda
 Red panda conservation

References

External links
Official Turtle Back Zoo Website
Red Pandas at the Turtle Back Zoo on YouTube

2000 animal births
2008 animal deaths
History of New Jersey